The 1948 United States presidential election in Louisiana took place on November 2, 1948, as part of the 1948 United States presidential election. State voters chose ten representatives, or electors, to the Electoral College, who voted for president and vice president.

Louisiana was won by Governor Strom Thurmond (DX–South Carolina), running with Governor Fielding L. Wright, with 49.07% of the popular vote, against incumbent President Harry S. Truman (D–Missouri), running with Senator Alben W. Barkley, with 32.75% of the popular vote, and Governor Thomas Dewey (R–New York), running with Governor Earl Warren, with 17.45% of the popular vote.

This was the first time Republicans won a parish in the state since 1936.

Results

Results by parish

See also
 United States presidential elections in Louisiana

Notes

References

Louisiana
1948
1948 Louisiana elections